Cyperus absconditicoronatus is a species of sedge that only grows in the wild in parts of Angola and Zambia in Africa.

The specific epithet is a reference to the scales on the rhizome that resemble a crown and is derived from words meaning with a hidden crown.

See also
 List of Cyperus species

References

absconditicoronatus
Flora of Zambia
Flora of Angola
Plants described in 2010